Casa Chiquita ("Small House") is an Ancestral Puebloan great house and archaeological site located in Chaco Canyon, northwestern New Mexico, United States.

Located near the old north entrance to the canyon, its layout features a smaller profile with a square block of rooms surrounding a central elevated round room, or kiva. It also lacked the open plazas and separate kivas of its predecessors. Larger, squarer blocks of stone were used in the masonry; its kivas were designed in the northern Mesa Verdean tradition. Its ruins now lie within Chaco Culture National Historical Park.

Citations

References 
 .
 .

External links 
 https://web.archive.org/web/20090712051944/http://www.colorado.edu/Conferences/chaco/tour/chaq.htm

Archaeological sites in New Mexico
Colorado Plateau
Chaco Canyon
Former populated places in New Mexico
Pueblo great houses
Chaco Culture National Historical Park
Ancestral Puebloans
Pueblos in New Mexico